The Drummer of Cortachy is the name given to a spirit who is thought to haunt Cortachy Castle. There are many interpretations of the story, but he is variously thought to portend the death of a member of the Ogilvy family, Earl of Airlie or the owners of Cortachy Castle. He is said to be nine foot tall and is occasionally accompanied by ghostly pipes. The legend can trace its roots back to at least the 19th century and the death of the 14th Earl of Airlie. He is said to play a tattoo when he appears.

The ghost is thought to be the spirit of a drummer for the Carlisle family; who was thrown out of a window in the high tower of the castle after incurring the jealousy of the then Lord. However, some versions of the story say that the drummer was the messenger for a hated chieftain and in yet another version of the tale, he is the spirit of a drummer who deliberately failed to warn the castle of an impending attack. In all versions of the tale he was stuffed into his drum before his death.

The most famous sighting of the drummer was in 1844, when the Lady Airlie (or in some versions, her guests) heard the noise. She would later write in a note on her deathbed that she 'knew the drumming was for [her]'.

The spirit is now thought to be dormant since in 1900 the Earl of Airlie died in the Boer War without a reported sighting.

See also
Cortachy Castle

References

Ghost stories